Pada is a village in Viru-Nigula Parish, Lääne-Viru County, in northeastern Estonia. It has a population of 63 (as of 1 January 2010).

The village was first mentioned in the Danish Census Book in 1241.

Tallinn–Narva highway (E20) passes through Pada in the valley of Pada River. During the snowstorm Monika in December 2010 the traffic was halted in the Padaorg valley, about 600 people got snowed in.

References

Villages in Lääne-Viru County